The 2000–01 season was the 77th season in the history of Rayo Vallecano and the club's second consecutive season in the top flight of Spanish football. In addition to the domestic league, Rayo Vallecano participated in this season's edition of the Copa del Rey and UEFA Cup.

Season summary
Rayo Vallecano reached the quarter-finals of the UEFA Cup.

Squad
Squad at end of season

Competitions

La Liga

League table

UEFA Cup

Quarter-finals

See also
Rayo Vallecano
2000–01 La Liga
Copa del Rey

References

Rayo Vallecano seasons
Rayo Vallecano